Café Clover was an American restaurant in New York City which opened in 2015. Its menu was health and plant-focused.

History

In 2017 a food market affiliated with the restaurant dubbed Clover Grocery opened nearby.

The restaurant closed in 2020 during the COVID-19 pandemic, and remained closed in October 2021. Before it closed, TimeOut described its food as "health-focused plates like chutney-topped cauliflower steak and quinoa tagliatelli studded with beet greens and sunflower kernels," and the decor as 1970s styled.

Ratings and reviews
In her review, published in The New Yorker, Amelia Lester gave credit to the restaurant for making the most of its oddly-shaped floor-plan, though she criticized the restaurant for being overly-focused on portion size.

References

Restaurants established in 2015
Defunct restaurants in New York City
2015 establishments in New York City
Restaurants disestablished during the COVID-19 pandemic
Restaurants disestablished in 2020
2020 disestablishments in New York (state)